Yeo Woon-kay  (February 25, 1940 – May 22, 2009) was a South Korean actress and television personality. She was best known for Korean films such as War of Money, Bad Family and My Lovely Sam Soon.

Yeo began acting while in high school. She continued to act while attending Korea University, where she studied literature. She became known for her work in Daehakgeuk, which is also called the amateur student theater, during the 1950s and 1960s, alongside other contemporary Korean actors like Lee Soon-jae.

She made her professional theater debut with a theater troupe in 1962. From theater, she was able to transition to a successful television career. She often played the role of a grandmother or "grandmotherly figure". Examples of these characters included her roles in Toji in 1986 and Jewel in the Palace in 2003.

Ms. Yeo was diagnosed with kidney cancer in 2007 while shooting the SBS TV series The King and I. But she continued to act and began work on the KBS2 production of Jang-hwa and Hong-ryeon (The Tale of Two Sisters), eventually quitting the production due to pneumonia, indicating the spread of cancer to her lungs.

Yeo entered the hospital intensive care unit in May 2009. Reports say that she fell into a coma and was placed on life support. She died around 8 P.M. on May 22, 2009, at the Incheon Catholic Medical Center in Incheon, South Korea, at the age of 69. Her funeral was held at the Severance Hospital.

Yeo was awarded the Life Achievement Award posthumously at the KBS Drama Awards in 2009.

Filmography

Film

Television series

References

External links

1940 births
2009 deaths
South Korean film actresses
Korea University alumni
People from Daegu
South Korean television actresses
Hamyang Yeo clan
South Korean Buddhists
Best Actress Paeksang Arts Award (television) winners